Remarks on Frazer's Golden Bough is a collection of Ludwig Wittgenstein's thoughts on James George Frazer's The Golden Bough: A Study in Magic and Religion. The commentary was initially published in 1967, with an English edition in 1979. Wittgenstein wrote the text in the summer of 1931, which represented his earliest efforts to compose what would eventually become the Philosophical Investigations (1953).

An important theme of the Remarks, and one which Wittgenstein would later explore more fully, is the conception of metaphysics as a "kind of magic". The text was edited by Rush Rhees, who published them separately from Wittgenstein's other work, in a possible attempt to avoid alienating Wittgenstein's readership, in light of the sympathy shown to primitive thought and practices. In the Remarks, Wittgenstein famously described Frazer as more savage than those he studied, and was exceptionally critical of Frazer's interpretations of primitive mythology, Christianity, and epistemology.

The remarks were later included in full in an anthology of Wittgenstein's miscellaneous work called Philosophical Occasions 1912-1951. The editors claim that Rush Rhees omitted a number of remarks from the bilingual book edition of the Remarks, and include in their anthology some remarks they believe Rhees may have erroneously excluded.

Further reading
Ludwig Wittgenstein, The Mythology in Our Language. Remarks on Frazer’s Golden Bough,
(German/English parallel text), Transl. by S. Palmié, Ed. by Giovanni da Col and S. Palmié, with critical reflections by V. Das, W. James, H. Kwon, M. Lambek, S. Laugier, K. Myhre, R. Needham, M. Puett, C. Severi, and M. Taussig, 2020, Hau Books, open access

References

1967 non-fiction books
Books by Ludwig Wittgenstein